Marvel Comics is a publisher of American comic books and related media. It counts among its characters such well-known superheroes as Spider-Man, Iron Man, Wolverine, Captain America, Thor, Hulk, Black Panther, Doctor Strange, Ant-Man, Daredevil, and Deadpool, and such teams as the Avengers, the X-Men, the Fantastic Four, and the Guardians of the Galaxy. Most of Marvel's fictional characters are depicted as occupying a shared fictional universe, most locations mirroring real-life places. Many major characters are based in New York City.

Film adaptations based on Marvel Comics properties have included theatrically released film serials, live action and animated feature films, direct-to-video releases, and television films.

Live-action films

Feature films
Live-action feature films and shorts produced by Marvel Studios are set within the Marvel Cinematic Universe (MCU) unless otherwise noted.

Serials and short films

From Marvel imprints
Icon Comics

Malibu Comics

Short films

Direct-to-video and television films

Episodes as films
The following films were television series episodes released as feature films, television films or direct-to-video movies.

From Malibu Comics

Animated films

Theatrically released films

Direct-to-video and television films

Episodes as films

Lego films

Short films

From Icon Comics

Reception

Box office

Critical and public response

Marvel imprints
Icon Comics

Malibu Comics

See also
 List of Marvel Cinematic Universe films
 Marvel One-Shots
 Sony's Spider-Man Universe
 List of television series based on Marvel Comics publications
 List of Marvel Cinematic Universe television series
 List of radio dramas based on Marvel Comics publications
 List of unproduced film projects based on Marvel Comics
 List of unproduced films based on Marvel Comics imprints publications
 List of unproduced Marvel Cinematic Universe projects

References

External links
 Movies at Marvel.com

 
Marvel Comics

Films based on Marvel Comics publications
Marvel Comics
Superhero films